Java Native Access (JNA) is a community-developed library that provides Java programs easy access to native shared libraries without using the Java Native Interface (JNI). JNA's design aims to provide native access in a natural way with a minimum of effort. Unlike JNI, no boilerplate or generated glue code is required.

Architecture 
The JNA library uses a small native library called foreign function interface library (libffi) to dynamically invoke native code. The JNA library uses native functions allowing code to load a library by name and retrieve a pointer to a function within that library, and uses libffi library to invoke it, all without static bindings, header files, or any compile phase. The developer uses a Java interface to describe functions and structures in the target native library. This makes it quite easy to take advantage of native platform features without incurring the high development overhead of configuring and building JNI code.

JNA is built and tested on macOS, Microsoft Windows, FreeBSD / OpenBSD, Solaris, Linux, AIX, Windows Mobile, and Android. It is also possible to tweak and recompile the native build configurations to make it work on most other platforms that run Java.

Mapping types
The following table shows an overview of types mapping between Java and native code and supported by the JNA library.

Note: The meaning of TCHAR changes between char and wchar_t according to some preprocessor definitions. LPCTSTR follows.

Memory byte alignment for data structures 
Native libraries have no standardized memory byte alignment flavor. JNA defaults to an OS platform specific setting, that can be overridden by a library specific custom alignment. If the alignment details are not given in the documentation of the native library, the correct alignment must be determined by trial and error during implementation of the Java wrapper.

Example 

The following program loads the local C standard library implementation and uses it to call the printf function.

Note: The following code is portable and works the same on Windows and POSIX (Linux / Unix / macOS) platforms.

import com.sun.jna.Library;
import com.sun.jna.Native;
import com.sun.jna.Platform;

/** Simple example of native library declaration and usage. */
public class HelloWorld {
    public interface CLibrary extends Library {
        CLibrary INSTANCE = (CLibrary) Native.loadLibrary(
            (Platform.isWindows() ? "msvcrt" : "c"), CLibrary.class);
        void printf(String format, Object... args);
    }

    public static void main(String[] args) {
        CLibrary.INSTANCE.printf("Hello, World\n");
        for (int i = 0; i < args.length; i++) {
            CLibrary.INSTANCE.printf("Argument %d: %s\n", i, args[i]);
        }
    }
}

The following program loads the C POSIX library and uses it to call the standard mkdir function.

Note: The following code is portable and works the same on POSIX standards platforms.

import com.sun.jna.Library;
import com.sun.jna.Native;

/** Simple example of native C POSIX library declaration and usage. */
public class ExampleOfPOSIX {
    public interface POSIX extends Library {
	    public int chmod(String filename, int mode);
	    public int chown(String filename, int user, int group);
	    public int rename(String oldpath, String newpath);
	    public int kill(int pid, int signal);
	    public int link(String oldpath, String newpath);
	    public int mkdir(String path, int mode);
	    public int rmdir(String path);
    }

    public static void main(String[] args) {
        // It is possible to load msvcrt for its partial POSIX support on Windows...
        POSIX posix = (POSIX) Native.loadLibrary("c", POSIX.class);
        // but it will still fail on Windows due to /tmp being missing.
	    posix.mkdir("/tmp/newdir", 0777);
	    posix.rename("/tmp/newdir","/tmp/renamedir");
    }
}

The program below loads the Kernel32.dll and uses it to call the Beep and Sleep functions.

Note: The following code works only on Windows platforms.
import com.sun.jna.Library;
import com.sun.jna.Native;

/** Simple example of Windows native library declaration and usage. */
public class BeepExample {
    public interface Kernel32 extends Library {
        // FREQUENCY is expressed in hertz and ranges from 37 to 32767
        // DURATION is expressed in milliseconds
        public boolean Beep(int FREQUENCY, int DURATION);
        public void Sleep(int DURATION);
    }

    public static void main(String[] args) {
	    Kernel32 lib = (Kernel32) Native.loadLibrary("kernel32", Kernel32.class);
	    lib.Beep(698, 500);
	    lib.Sleep(500);
	    lib.Beep(698, 500);
    }
}

See also

 JNAerator
 P/Invoke
 SWIG

References

External links
 Java Native Access Web Page
 Java Native Access - Download page
 Java Native Access - User Mailing List
 
 
 
 
 

Java platform